Isabelle Linden (born 15 January 1991) is a German footballer. She plays as a midfielder for the Hungarian club Ferencváros TC. Former player of the German national team, she retired from professional football in 2020  before coming back from her retirement one year later.

Club career
Isabelle Linden began her junior career at VfR Fischenich and SC Fortuna Köln before joining the senior team of SC Fortuna Köln. She played for SGS Essen before joining Fußball-Bundesliga side Bayer 04 Leverkusen in 2009. She moved to 1. FFC Frankfurt ahead of the 2015–16 season.

International career
She was called up to be part of the national team for the UEFA Women's Euro 2013.

Honors

International
UEFA Women's Championship: Winner (1) 2013
UEFA Women's Under-17 Championship: Winner 2008

Personal life
Linden is one of the ambassadors for WePlayStrong, a women's football movement initiated by UEFA alongside Lisa Evans, Shanice van de Sanden and Eunice Beckmann. She is also openly gay.

References

External links
 Profile at the German Football Federation 
 
 
 
 Profile at soccerdonna.de

1991 births
Living people
German women's footballers
German expatriate women's footballers
Footballers from Cologne
Germany women's international footballers
SC Fortuna Köln players
Bayer 04 Leverkusen (women) players
1. FFC Frankfurt players
Women's Super League players
Birmingham City W.F.C. players
Expatriate women's footballers in England
German expatriate sportspeople in England
Frauen-Bundesliga players
UEFA Women's Championship-winning players
Women's association football midfielders
1. FC Köln (women) players